A saga is a story in Old Norse about ancient Scandinavian and Germanic history.

Saga may also refer to:

Places
Saga, Russia, a rural locality (a selo) in the Sakha Republic, Russia
Saga, Tibet, a town and the seat of Saga County
Saga County, a county in Tibet
Saga Prefecture, a prefecture of Japan
Saga (city), the capital of Saga Prefecture
Saga Domain, Japanese domain in the Edo period, which covers the area of current Saga Prefecture and part of Nagasaki Prefecture
Saga, a district in Kyoto, Japan
Saga, alternative name of Suquh, a village in North Khorasan Province, Iran

People
Emperor Saga (785–842), ruler of Japan from 809 to 823
Nabeshima clan, also known as the Saga family, a clan of Japanese nobles

Arts and entertainment

Fictional characters
Gemini Saga, one of the twelve Gold Saints in Saint Seiya, created by Masami Kurumada
Kamen Rider Saga, the third Rider from Kamen Rider Kiva
Saga, the protagonist of the anime A Little Snow Fairy Sugar
Saga Norén, one of the protagonists of the Swedish/Danish TV series The Bridge

Gaming
SAGA (wargame), a historical miniature wargame published by Gripping Beast and Studio Tomahawk
Saga: Rage of the Vikings a 1998 video game by Cryo Interactive
Saga (2008 video game), an MMORTS computer game developed by Silverlode Interactive
SaGa (series), a video game franchise by Square Enix
SAGA System, a role-playing game system
Urza's Saga, an expansion set of Magic: The Gathering
SAGA (Scripts for Animated Graphic Adventures), a game engine used in Inherit the Earth

Music

Artists
Saga (Alice Nine), bassist of Visual Kei band Alice Nine
Saga (band), a Canadian rock band
Saga (singer) (born 1975), Swedish female white nationalist singer

Albums
Saga (album), the band's first album
Sagas (album), a 2008 album by German folk metal band Equilibrium

Events
Saga (event), an annual musical festival organized by Royal College, Colombo

Literature
Saga (2006 novel), by Conor Kostick
Saga, a 1940 novel by Erico Verissimo
SAGA (play), a 2013 play performed by Wakka Wakka Productions

Other arts and entertainment
Ultraman Saga, the 45th anniversary Ultraman movie
Saga (comics), a comic book series published monthly by Image Comics

Businesses
Saga Airlines, a Turkish airline
Saga Corporation, a defunct food service management company that is now part of Sodexo
Saga Radio Group, a defunct British radio broadcaster
Saga Falabella, a department store chain in Peru
Saga Group, British company focused on the needs of people over 50
Saga Musical Instruments, an American manufacturer and wholesale distributor of stringed instruments
Saga Petroleum, a Norwegian petroleum company acquired by Norsk Hydro in 1999
Saga Petroleum LLC, an American petroleum company
Saga plc, a British travel and insurance company 
Saga Press, an American publisher
Saga Rail. defunct train operator in Sweden
Société Anonyme de Gérance et d'Armement, the French state shipping line founded in 1919

Computers
SAGA C++ Reference Implementation, an implementation of the OGF SAGA standard
SAGA GIS, a geographic information system
Simple API for Grid Applications, The Open Grid Forum SAGA (Simple API for Grid Applications) standard
Saga interaction pattern, a design-pattern for implementing a long-running transactions

Organizations
Smocking Arts Guild of America
Society of American Graphic Artists
Swordsmen and Sorcerers' Guild of America (SAGA), the name of a literary group of American fantasy authors

Science
1163 Saga, an asteroid
Akar Saga, the Malay name of a leguminous climber with hard, red seeds, Abrus precatorius
Saga (bush cricket), a genus of European bush crickets
Saga, the Malay name of a tree with hard, red seeds, Adenanthera pavonina
SAGA, Spt-Ada-Gcn5 Acetyltransferase, a histone acetyltransferase complex
SAGA, Strömgren survey for Asteroseismology and Galactic Archaeology
SAGA, a stochastic variance reduction algorithm for mathematical optimisation.

Transportation
, a ferry operated by Swedish Lloyd 1972–1977
 Alpha Saga, a 2022– American electric compact sedan
 Proton Saga, a 1985–present Malaysian subcompact car

Other uses
Saga (magazine), men's adventure pulp magazine published by Macfadden Publications in the 1950s–80s
Saga (cheese), a blue cheese from Denmark
Sága, a goddess in Norse mythology

See also

 
 Sagas (disambiguation)